Nubian may refer to:

Something of, from, or related to Nubia, a region along the Nile river in Southern Egypt and northern Sudan. 
Nubian people
Nubian languages
Anglo-Nubian goat, a breed of goat
Nubian ibex
 , several ships of the British Royal Navy

See also
Nubian Desert
Nubian Plate
Nubian pyramids
Nubian Square
Nubian wig

Language and nationality disambiguation pages